Ventrifossa longibarbata is a species of rattail. This is a deep-water fish found at depths of up to 600 m. It is found in the waters off southern Japan and northern Taiwan.

This is a largely bright silver rattail which reaches a length of up to 30 cm. It has a small head with a short, broad snout, an inferior mouth and a long barbel on the lower jaw. The first dorsal fin is black with white base and tip. There is a small bioluminescent organ located between the bases of the pelvic fins.

References
A new species, Caelorinchus sheni, and 19 new records of grenadiers (Pisces: Gadiformes: Macrouridae) from Taiwan - CHIOU Mei-Luen ; SHAO Kwang-Tsao ; IWAMOTO Tomio

Macrouridae
Fish described in 1982